The following is a list of Coppin State Eagles men's basketball head coaches. There have been seven head coaches of the Eagles in their 59-season history.

Coppin State's most recent head coach is Juan Dixon. He was hired as the Eagles' head coach in April 2017, replacing Michael Grant, who was fired after the 2016–17 season.

References

Coppin State

Coppin State Eagles men's basketball coaches